Laigné is a former commune in the Mayenne department in north-western France. On 1 January 2018, it was merged into the new commune of Prée-d'Anjou.

See also
Communes of the Mayenne department

References 

Former communes of Mayenne
Populated places disestablished in 2018